Monica Rambeau is a superhero appearing in American comic books published by Marvel Comics. Created by writer Roger Stern and artist John Romita Jr., the character first appeared in The Amazing Spider-Man Annual #16 (October 1982). Monica gained super powers after being bombarded by extradimensional energy produced by an energy disruptor weapon. She joined and eventually became leader of the Avengers for a time. She was also a member of Nextwave and the latest Ultimates team. The character has also been known as Captain Marvel, Photon, Pulsar, and Spectrum at various points in her history.

Akira Akbar portrayed young Monica Rambeau in the Marvel Cinematic Universe film Captain Marvel (2019). Teyonah Parris portrays the adult version of Rambeau in the television miniseries WandaVision (2021) and will also appear in The Marvels (2023).

Publication history
The character, created by writer Roger Stern and artist John Romita Jr., first appears in The Amazing Spider-Man Annual #16 (October 1982).

Talking about the visual features of the character, Romita noted that, originally, the character was intended to look like actress Pam Grier, but her appearance was changed before publication:

Following her debut, the character appeared throughout the entirety of Stern's five-year run on The Avengers, ultimately becoming the team's leader, before making numerous appearances as a reserve member after her departure from active duty. Two one-shot titles, both written by Dwayne McDuffie and illustrated by Mark D. Bright, followed. She also starred in Avengers: Unplugged #5. She returned in The Avengers (vol. 3) with sporadic appearances between issues #1–59. During this run, she also appeared in Avengers: Infinity #1–4 (September–December 2000), Maximum Security #2–3 (both January 2001), Thor (vol. 2) #30 (January 2001) and the Avengers Annual in 2001.

Following a cameo in Great Lakes Avengers #1 and New Thunderbolts #8–9, she appeared in Order #5–6. She starred in Nextwave #1–12. Following the cancellation of that series, Rambeau was seen briefly in Civil War, She-Hulk, and as a main character in Marvel Divas #1–4 and Heralds #1–5. She appears Iron Age #1 (2011), Captain Marvel #7–8, Journey into Mystery #649, and Age of Ultron.

In 2009, Rambeau appeared in the limited series, Marvel Divas (partly inspired by Sex and the City). She was one of the main characters, alongside Black Cat, Hellcat, and Firestar.

Starting in September 2013, she appeared as one of the lead characters in the Marvel NOW! relaunch of Mighty Avengers, she acted as the team's field leader under the new codename Spectrum.

She was part of the 2015's Ultimates team, written by Al Ewing and drawn by Kenneth Rocafort, the team consisted of Monica Rambeau, Black Panther, Blue Marvel, Miss America, and Captain Marvel. In Marvel NOW! (2016), the Ultimates broke up but are later reunited and asked to become the heralds of Galactus, who is now the Lifebringer of Worlds. The second volume ended at a special #100 issue and it includes an appearance of the original Ultimates team.

She was a major character in the Avengers weekly story-arc Avengers: No Road Home, alongside Hawkeye, Hercules, Hulk, Scarlet Witch, Vision, Voyager and Rocket Raccoon. It was meant to be a spiritual successor to previous Avengers weekly story-arc, Avengers: No Surrender.

In August 2022, Marvel Comics announced Monica Rambeau's first solo comic book series Photon, set to be released in December 2022.

Fictional character biography

Origin
Monica Rambeau was born in New Orleans, Louisiana to Frank and Maria Rambeau. She was a lieutenant in the New Orleans harbor patrol, where she operated as a cargo ship captain. While trying to stop a dangerous weapon, Rambeau was exposed to extra-dimensional energy and became capable of converting her body to energy. After this event, the media dubbed her "Captain Marvel." Following a close call where her excess energy nearly made her a danger to others before that power was drained off by Iron Man and Spider-Man, she decided to use her powers to fight crime under that name. She was told by Ben Grimm that the name had originally been used by the late Kree hero Mar-Vell, but Grimm assured her that "[Marvel] wouldn't mind. I probably ain't the only 'Thing' in the world either."

Joining the Avengers
Rambeau sought out the Avengers for help in mastering her new powers and became a member-in-training, soon aiding them against Egghead. Befriended and mentored by Avengers veterans Captain America and the Wasp, Captain Marvel soon graduated to full membership after the battle against Plantman. She became their first African-American heroine.

She assisted Doctor Strange and the Scarlet Witch in battling Dracula.

Two of Rambeau's enemies are super-powered psychiatrist Moonstone (Karla Sofen), and Moonstone's powerful pawn Blackout (Marcus Daniels), who wields the Darkforce. Captain Marvel first encountered them when the Avengers opposed the duo's escape from incarceration in Project: PEGASUS. After that, Rambeau temporarily lost her ability to transform back to human form during a battle against Dr. Eric Paulson, in which she fought alongside Spider-Man and Starfox. She was with the team when the Beyonder abducted them and other Earth superheroes for the first Secret Wars saga.

Moonstone and Blackout returned as members of Baron Zemo's Masters of Evil, participating in an occupation of Avengers Mansion and trapping Rambeau in the Darkforce dimension. With help from The Shroud, Rambeau was able to escape in time to help retake the Mansion. During the battle, Moonstone became temporarily paralyzed and Blackout died. Another of Rambeau's major early foes was the murderous interstellar pirate Nebula, who shanghaied Rambeau into space for an extended period before she reunited with the Avengers.

Captain Marvel also took part in battles against the Beyonder, a confused Jean Grey, Kang the Conqueror, Attuma, and Grandmaster.

Leader of the Avengers
Rambeau later replaced the Wasp as leader of the Avengers, commanding them in battles against the X-Men, the Olympian Gods, and the Super-Adaptoid. She spent a lot of time refereeing squabbles between Hercules and the Submariner, and dealing with the duplicitous telepath Dr. Druid, who sought to supplant her as Avengers chairman and undermined her authority at every opportunity.

When honorary Avengers member and wife of the Submariner Marrina transformed into the gigantic sea monster Leviathan, Captain Marvel led the hunt for the creature. During the battle that followed, Rambeau transformed herself into a massive bolt of lightning to try and stop the beast. She made contact with the water and accidentally conducted herself across the surface of the ocean, dispersing her atoms so widely that she barely regained physical form. She reformed as a frail, withered husk of a woman devoid of super-powers.

Regaining her powers
After retiring from the team, Rambeau regained first her physical health, and eventually her powers, initially developing the ability to manipulate mechanical energy for various effects. She resumed crimefighting, facing foes such as Brazilian crime lord Kristina Ramos, Moonstone, and Powderkeg. At the same time, she served as a cargo ship captain in her friend Ron Morgan's shipping company before starting her own charter business.

Rambeau stayed connected with the Avengers and served as a reservist, sometimes assuming leadership duties in the absence of the current chair. She helped repel an Atlantean invasion of the surface world and assists in the Acts of Vengeance, which involved a concentrated, multi-villain attack on Earth's superheroes, or in the Terminus Factor. Rambeau led a reserve substitute roster during the team's first United Nations-backed reorganization. She took on another leadership role during the Kree-Shi'ar war and led an Avengers delegation to the Shi'ar Empire to petition for peace.

When a group of aliens calling themselves Starblasters tried to push the moon away from Earth, Quasar assembled a team with some of the most powerful heroes of the world, recruiting Rambeau, Carol Danvers, Black Bolt, Hyperion, Ikaris, Darkstar, Vanguard and  Perun. During this adventure, her original powers gradually regenerated, fully returning when the alien Stranger accelerates the process.

When Genis became an adventurer, he was known as Captain Marvel like his father before him—which Rambeau resented. After she, Starfox and Genis teamed up to defeat the Controller, Genis tried to concede the Captain Marvel title to Rambeau since he felt she was more worthy of it. Rambeau declined out of respect for the Mar-Vell legacy and adopted the new alias Photon.

Avengers Return
After the return of the main Avengers from the pocket universe created by Franklin Richards almost all the current and former Avengers members were trapped in a curse created by Morgan Le Fay where they served her as soldiers in a guard called Queen's Vengeance. Due to her strong loyalty to the group Rambeau, under the name Daystar, was one of the first Avengers to recover their will and rebel against the sorceress.

Later when Photon was attacked by the Wrecking Crew in the Mardi Gras of New Orleans, she asked the Avengers for help and wound up being involved in an adventure in Arkon's world with the group and her old fellow Avenger, Black Knight.

For a time, Rambeau's mother intercepted her Avengers calls out of fear for her daughter's safety. After discovering this deception, Rambeau led an unofficial force of Avengers against the 'Infinites', who planned on relocating the galaxy. Next, Photon was involved in the events of Maximum Security, and fought with her former teammates against Bloodwraith, and Lord Templar and Pagan.

After that, Rambeau helped the team in the deep-space monitoring station with Quasar and Living Lightning, called into action in Kang's War, (supporting also her friend Janet van Dyne and advising the new recruit Triathlon on his current issues as the newest member of the team), in the world crisis caused by Zodiac, and when the Scarlet Witch suffered a nervous breakdown and attacked the Avengers.

From Pulsar to Nextwave
When Genis-Vell wanted to establish a new identity for himself, he began calling himself Photon. Rambeau confronted him but decided to let Genis keep the Photon alias after she came up with a name she liked better, Pulsar.

Rambeau later led the Nextwave team, part of the Highest Anti-Terrorism Effort (H.A.T.E.), against Unusual Weapons of Mass Destruction created by the Beyond Corporation© where she avoided using a code name and wore a new uniform.

During the Superhero Civil War, Rambeau was a member of Captain America's Secret Avengers, but also registered as a member of the Initiative.

When Brother Voodoo asked for Rambeau's help in tracking down some evil sorcerers, she revealed a former relationship with Brother Voodoo to Black Cat, Hellcat, and Firestar. Despite her breaking it off, Voodoo still had feelings for Rambeau. She agreed to aid him, rekindling their relationship in the process.

She later attended Emma Frost's birthday party in Las Vegas where she helped solve a cosmic crisis involving Frankie Raye.

The group continued to meet partly over their support of Firestar, who had recovered from breast cancer. She assisted Carol Danvers, in an investigation in the Gulf of Mexico, where Rambeau indicated that she was still fearful of using her powers under the water since her traumatic experience in battle against Marrina Smallwood, and aided Iron Man in the Avengers' deep-space monitoring station against ancient Viking monsters who claimed to be the Emperor of Mars.

Marvel Now!
During the Infinity storyline, Monica Rambeau took the name of Spectrum as she chased after the criminal Blue Streak. Even the police officers that arrested him were impressed by her latest alias and her new costume. Spectrum returned to a specialist shop in New York where a man named Luc sells designer superhero costumes. He mentioned that someone was waiting for her in the next room. Monica recognized the man, though apparently all he wanted to do was talk and ask for help. Spectrum heard the explosions when Proxima Midnight began her attack on the city. Her mysterious guest says he cannot be seen in America, and needed her help for a mysterious mission, but she was adamant...he is in a costume shop, and if he wanted her help, he'd put on a costume and come help her.

Monica became field leader of Luke Cage's new Mighty Avengers team in the wake of the event.

During the "Last Days" part of the Secret Wars storyline, Spectrum devised a plan to destroy Earth-1610 to keep it from colliding with Earth-616. In desperation during the two weeks before the end of the world, Spectrum channeled her full power and went to destroy Earth-1610. However, right before she could successfully destroy the other Earth, she spotted a group of children who lived there, causing her to hesitate for only a moment, long enough for Ultimate Reed Richards to capture her.

In the aftermath of the "Devil's Reign" storyline, Spectrum assists the newly-elected Mayor Luke Cage in taking down a Thunderbolts unit led by Crossbones. Afterwards, public relations specialist Helen Astrantia wanted Spectrum to lead the re-branded Thunderbolts. She turns down the suggestion and flies off.

Powers and abilities
Due to bombardment by extra-dimensional energies, Rambeau can transform herself into any form of energy within the electromagnetic spectrum. Among the many energy forms she has assumed and is able to control are visible light, cosmic rays, gamma rays, X-rays, ultraviolet radiation, electricity, infrared radiation, microwaves, radio waves, and neutrinos. By assuming an energy-form, she gains all of that energy's properties.

She is invisible and intangible in many of her energy forms (the most frequent exception being visible light), and is capable of flight in all her energy forms (reaching velocities up to and including light speed). She also has the ability to project these energies from her body while she is in human form (only one wavelength of energy at a time), usually in the form of energy blasts from her hands. She mentally controls both the type and quantity of energy she wishes to transmit. The maximum amount of energy she can transmit at a given time is unknown. Rambeau can also divert small amounts of various energies for employment as force beams, which have the equivalent to 300 tons of TNT of explosive force. A variation of this ability enables her to project light-based holographic illusions of herself. Rambeau has also shown the ability to split her energy form into several miniature energy forms that are under her mental command, each miniature Rambeau is able to react and fly at light-speed.

When she encounters a new or unfamiliar energy, Rambeau can often duplicate it given enough time for analysis. Rambeau tends to be physically insubstantial in her energy forms, though with concentration and effort she can sometimes perform tasks such as briefly grasping an object, either by partially solidifying or by applying some sort of force to the object in question.

She is immortal and does not age beyond her prime.

When Rambeau temporarily lost her original powers after a massive energy expenditure, she developed the ability to shunt any mechanical energy directed towards her through a dimensional interface surrounding her body, granting her increased strength, resistance to impact, and the ability to fly. After Rambeau asked Reed Richards to examine these new abilities, he theorized that she accessed the same dimension from which she derived her energy powers to create the interface.

Rambeau has strong leadership skills and law enforcement experience due to both of her time as a police officer and former leader of the Avengers. She is an excellent markswoman, unarmed combatant, detective, and swimmer with extensive nautical expertise. She has received Harbor Patrol training, and Avengers training in unarmed combat by Captain America.

Limitations
Rambeau is able to retain her energy form for several hours with no ill effects. She can only transform herself into one wavelength of energy at a time, but she can transform between one energy-state and another in a fraction of a second. Extensive energy transformation and manipulation can be physically taxing once she re-assumes her physical form. Rambeau can also be involuntarily reverted to her original form by other forces.

Reception

Critical reception 
Nick Hemming of Looper stated, "The truth is, Monica Rambeau, created by Roger Stern and John Romita Jr. in 1982, is a spectacular heroine in her own right. Few understand just how monumental her contributions to the Marvel universe truly are, nor how massive her character potential remains, decades after her debut. As a character, her impressive energy-manipulating powers make her an Alpha-Level threat, while her strong leadership and sarcastic wit make her a fan-favorite This is the untold truth of Marvel's all-too-often forgotten Avenger, Monica Rambeau." Andy Davis of Screen Rant wrote, "Marvel has one of the biggest libraries of superheroes and villains in comic history, and seeing former Captain Marvel Monica Rambeau finally get her own solo Photon series is inspiring not just because she'll get her story told, but also because it opens the door for other beloved characters to finally get their moment in the spotlight in the future as Monica lights the way as a true superhero."

Accolades 

 In 2015, Gizmodo ranked Monica Rambeau 10th in their "Every Member Of The Avengers, Ranked" list.
 In 2018, CBR.com ranked Monica Rambeau 8th in their "25 Fastest Characters In The Marvel Universe" list.
 In 2019, CBR.com ranked Monica Rambeau 4th in their "All The Captain Marvels" list.
 In 2020, Scary Mommy included Monica Rambeau in their "Looking For A Role Model? These 195+ Marvel Female Characters Are Truly Heroic" list.
 In 2022, Screen Rant ranked Monica Rambeau 1st in their "15 Fastest Superheroes" list, 13th in their "16 Most Powerful Cosmic Characters In Marvel Comics" list, and included her in their "10 Most Powerful Avengers In Marvel Comics" list.
 In 2022, Screen Rant included Monica Rambeau in their "10 Best Marvel Characters Who Made Their Debut In Spider-Man Comics" list.
 In 2022, The A.V. Club ranked Monica Rambeau 95th in their "100 best Marvel characters" list.
 In 2022, Newsarama ranked Monica Rambeau 16th in their "Best female superheroes" list.
 In 2022, CBR.com ranked Monica Rambeau 3rd in their "8 Fastest Avengers" list, 4th in their "10 Best Marvel Legacy Heroes" list, 8th in their "Avengers' Greatest Leaders" list, and 11th in their "Marvel's Strongest Cosmic Heroes" list.

Literary reception

Volumes

Captain Marvel: Monica Rambeau - 2019 
According to Diamond Comic Distributors, the Captain Marvel: Monica Rambeau trade paperback was the 112th best selling graphic novel in January 2019.

Photon - 2022 
Megan Loucks of CBR.com called Photon #1 a "perfect example of respecting the past and embracing the future," writing, "Overall, Monica Rambeau: Photon #1 is a great beginning of a new journey for the former Avenger that sets up something special for new and old fans of Monica. Ewing does an excellent job of respecting the character's past while making room for her to grow. With a creative team that hit it out of the park, this limited series is a relatable story of self-discovery. This limited series has something for everyone." Spencer Perry of Comicbook.com gave Photon #1 a grade of 3.5 out of 5, saying, "Eve Ewing's new run on Monica Rambeau reminds readers, or perhaps confirms to new ones, why this character can be so compelling, even if there's more than the necessary amount of cameos. Ewing's work on the series is already character-driven with enough of a plot tease for what's to come that this first issue doesn't feel like a total exposition dump. Artists Luca Maresca and Ivan Fiorelli are credited with pencils which seem largely to fit the Marvel house style, nothing too exciting and largely similar in nature to every other regular book from the publisher. They do have a handful of moments with unique panel layouts however, including in the final page, which they should lean into more."

Other versions

Age of Ultron
During the Age of Ultron storyline, Rambeau appears amongst the superhero resistance against Ultron.

Earth-A
Like other inhabitants of this reality, Monica Rambeau would periodically visit Earth-616 for vacations. Due to the nature of the interdimensional travel, she received duplicate powers to her counterpart and would masquerade as her. It is implied that the inexperienced Rambeau appearing around that time in Black Panther was, in fact, this alternate. Rambeau claimed that the main reason she visited Earth-616 was not because she would gain superpowers but because her parents were still alive in that reality.

Forever Yesterday
Monica Rambeau is featured in New Warriors #11–13, in an alternate reality that is listed as Earth-9105, where she goes under the code-name of Sceptre. She is part of a murderous version of the Avengers, who enforce the will of the tyrannical female Sphinx. She briefly makes an appearance in Avengers Forever when she and several other alternate, evil Avengers are brought forth in order to battle the main protagonists.

JLA/Avengers
Photon is shown as a reservist member of the Avengers and aids them during the searching of the twelve items of power, fighting against the Green Lantern. After the battle for the last item in the Savage Land, Monica takes part in one annual JLA-Avengers meeting at the Justice League Satellite in the new merged world that the villain Krona created, being unaware of the changes. After that she appeared fighting along with other Captain Marvels of both universes (Mar-Vell, Shazam!) in the final battle.

Marvel Zombies
Monica Rambeau appears in Marvel Zombies vs. The Army of Darkness issue #3 in her Nextwave uniform, fighting alongside the rest of the team against a zombified Power Pack.

MC2
Although Monica Rambeau has never appeared in Marvel Comics' future-era MC2 line, the comics feature her daughter by Derek Freeman, Blacklight, who first appears in A-Next #9.

What If?
Monica Rambeau has a brief appearance in "What if the Scarlet Witch Hadn't Acted Alone?", What If? Avengers Disassembled (2006).

In other media

Marvel Cinematic Universe 
Monica Rambeau appears in live-action media set in the Marvel Cinematic Universe.
Monica is introduced as a child in the film Captain Marvel, portrayed primarily by Akira Akbar. This version is the daughter of Maria Rambeau and friend of Carol Danvers, whom Monica affectionately refers as "Auntie Carol", who in turn refers to Monica as "Lieutenant Trouble". After Danvers departs from Earth to take Skrull refugees to safety, Monica expresses a desire to fly in space as well.
An adult Monica appears in the Disney+ miniseries WandaVision, portrayed by Teyonah Parris. As an adult, Monica followed in her mother and Danvers' footsteps by joining the United States Air Force and attaining the rank of captain. Following her discharge, she joined S.W.O.R.D. In 2018, while accompanying her mother to the hospital for her cancer treatments, Monica became a victim of the Blip. When she returned, she discovered that her mother died two years after her disappearance. Monica returns to S.W.O.R.D. and is then sent to investigate Westview, New Jersey, where she is pulled through a CMBR field, later nicknamed the "Hex", while investigating it. She ends up in a sitcom-themed reality where she plays a character called "Geraldine" after encountering Wanda Maximoff. However, once Monica remembers her reality, Maximoff throws her out. Due to her experience, Monica's cells begin to change at the molecular level, with astrophysicist Dr. Darcy Lewis warning her that prolonged exposure might alter her molecular integrity. Due to acting S.W.O.R.D. Director Tyler Hayward's increasing hostility towards Maximoff, Monica decides to re-enter the hex to warn her with the help of Lewis and FBI agent Jimmy Woo. After pushing her way through the Hex and gaining the ability to detect electromagnetic radiation and energy absorption, she locates Maximoff and attempts to establish a connection with her, but the latter distrusts her and attempts to throw her out again. After Monica resists, she tries again, but is interrupted by Agatha Harkness, who takes Maximoff away. Monica attempts to pursue, but is caught by Westview resident Ralph Bohner before she frees him from Agatha's control. Following this, Monica stops Hayward from attacking Maximoff's sons Billy and Tommy and meets with her once more, empathizing with her before Maximoff goes into hiding. After Hayward is arrested, Monica is visited by a disguised Skrull, who asks her to meet with a friend of her mother's in space.
Parris will reprise her role as Monica in the film The Marvels.

Collected editions

References

External links
 
 
 
 
Captain Marvel a.k.a. Photon (1982) at Don Markstein's Toonopedia. Archived from the original on April 9, 2012.
 

African-American superheroes
Avengers (comics) characters
Black people in comics
Captain Marvel (Marvel Comics)
Characters created by John Romita Jr.
Characters created by Roger Stern
Comics characters introduced in 1982
Fictional characters from New Orleans
Fictional characters who can manipulate light
Fictional characters who can turn intangible
Fictional characters who can turn invisible
Fictional characters with absorption or parasitic abilities
Fictional characters with electric or magnetic abilities
Fictional characters with energy-manipulation abilities
Fictional characters with nuclear or radiation abilities
Fictional police lieutenants
Fictional sea captains
Marvel Comics characters who can move at superhuman speeds
Marvel Comics female superheroes
Marvel Comics film characters
Marvel Comics martial artists
Marvel Comics mutates